Gretchen Stephanie Mendiola Espina (born January 8, 1988 in Quezon City, Philippines) is a Filipino singer, actress and politician who rose to notability after winning Pinoy Idol, an interactive reality-based singing competition. Although she is credited as the first Pinoy Idol, Espina is technically the second winner of a Philippine Idol franchise, after Mau Marcelo of Philippine Idol in 2006. She came from the political family of Espinas of Biliran. Her father Rogelio Espina, is a former governor and the current representative of the lone district of Biliran, while her grandfather Gerardo Espina, Sr. is a former representative and mayor of Naval, Biliran and her uncle Gerardo Espina, Jr is a former representative and current governor of Biliran.

Biography

Early life
Espina came from a musically-inclined family who is also the prominent political family in Biliran, with her father, Congressman Dr. Rogelio "Roger" J. Espina, Representative of the Lone District of Biliran, described as a "good piano player and singer." Her mother, Cecil, works as a pediatrician; while her grandfather, Gerry, was a Mayor of Kawayan, Biliran. Her uncle, Gerry (Gerryboy) Espina Jr. is the present Governor of Biliran.

Espina was born in Quezon City, Metro Manila, where she spent her early years studying in School of the Holy Spirit before transferring to Naval Central School where she finished elementary level with honors.  She had her secondary education in Cathedral School of La Naval, where she graduated as a salutatorian.

Espina pursued college in University of the Philippines Diliman campus in Quezon City, with a major in European Languages.  She is a member of The University of the Philippines Singing Ambassadors and represented UP in the Inter-Collegiate Singing Contest held in Shantou University, Guangdong, China, where she won the first prize as a solo performer.

2006: Philippine Idol
She was in Philippine Idol'''s top 40, but was cut from getting into the top 24.

2008: Pinoy Idol
Espina auditioned in SM Mall of Asia.  This was despite her parents' disapproval of her auditioning because they wanted her to finish college first. News about Espina included was among 179 aspirants who passed the auditions was passed around in Biliran through SMS. She was never among the finalists with the lowest number of votes, also known as "The Bottom Group", during the competition. The finale was described as a competition among the Philippines' three major island groups, with Espina representing Visayas while runners-up Jayann Bautista of Pampanga representing Luzon and Ram Chaves of Cagayan de Oro representing Mindanao. After her win, she revealed that she would give P100,000 (roughly US$2,000) to each of her two runners-up as part of their agreement. She was slated to record her first single under Sony-BMG Philippines with "To You", the Pinoy Idol coronation song.

Pinoy Idol performances

2009: Shining Through
On June 19, 2009, she was re-introduced after months of being away from the limelight due to a throat ailment she had gotten during her stint in Pinoy Idol last year, in the 59th Anniversary Celebration of GMA Network held at the Araneta Coliseum singing medley of songs. On July 5, 2009 she was welcomed as a new regular performer and co-host of the musical variety show SOP Rules.

Espina's debut album entitled Shining Through was released on August 4, 2009 by Sony Music Philippines and 19 Recordings with the carrier single entitled "Kasalanan Nga Ba?", originally sung and owned by Thor which is the theme song of the drama series Sine Novela: Tinik Sa Dibdib. The album also includes "To You", her "victory song" of Pinoy Idol.

In 2010, Espina made her first acting debut in Diva as Debbie Romasanta, Tiffany's (Glaiza de Castro) best friend and personal assistant who helps her to make Sam/Melody's (Regine Velasquez) life miserable.

Political career
In May 2022, she was elected as the new Mayor of Naval, Biliran.

Discography
2009: Shining ThroughTour
2008: Ogie Sings with the Idols''

Filmography

Television

Awards and nominations

References

1988 births
Reality show winners
Filipino women pop singers
Idols (TV series) winners
Participants in Philippine reality television series
Living people
People from Quezon City
People from Biliran
GMA Network personalities
University of the Philippines Diliman alumni
Mayors of places in Biliran